James, Jamie, Jim, or Jimmy Kennedy may refer to:

Business
 James Gerard Kennedy Sr. (1907–1997), construction magnate
 James C. Kennedy (born 1948), billionaire; CEO and Chairman of the media conglomerate Cox Enterprises
 Jim Kennedy (media executive), American media executive

Entertainment
 Jimmy Kennedy (1902–1984), Irish songwriter, "Istanbul (Not Constantinople)", "Teddy Bears' Picnic", "The Hokey Pokey"
 Jamie Kennedy (born 1970), American comedian and actor
 Jamie DeWolf (born 1977), American poet-comedian whose birth name is Jamie Kennedy
 James Kennedy, author of The Order of Odd-Fish
 James Kennedy, cast member on Vanderpump Rules

Politics
 James Buckham Kennedy (1844–1930), Canadian lumberman and Liberal politician
 James Kennedy (congressman) (1853–1928), U.S. Congressman from Ohio, 1903–1911
 James Kennedy (Canadian politician) (1869–1915), merchant and political figure in Prince Edward Island, Canada
 James Kennedy (Australian politician) (1882–1954), Australian politician and footballer
 James Kennedy (Irish politician) (1909–1968), TD for Wexford, 1965–1968
 James Kennedy (New Hampshire politician) (born 1945), New Hampshire State Representative, 2006–present
 James J. Kennedy (born 1953), Mayor of Rahway, New Jersey
 James Kennedy (MP), British Member of Parliament for Tiverton

Sports
 Jim Kennedy (Australian footballer) (1908–1980), Australian rules footballer
 Jimmy Kennedy (footballer) (1883–1947), Scottish footballer
 Jim Kennedy (footballer, born 1934) (1934–2003), Scottish footballer (Celtic FC, Greenock Morton FC, Scotland)
 Jimmy Kennedy (rugby league), rugby league footballer of the 1910s and 1920s for Hull F.C.
 Jimmy Kennedy (American football) (born 1979), professional American football player
 Jimmy Kennedy (hurler, born 1891) (1891–1973), Irish hurler, Carrigtwohill GAA, Cork GAA
 Jimmy Kennedy (hurler, born 1926) (1926–2007), Irish hurler for Tipperary and Dublin
 Jim Kennedy (manager) (1862–1904), Major League Baseball manager, Brooklyn Gladiators, 1890
 Jim Kennedy (infielder) (born 1946), Major League Baseball player for the St. Louis Cardinals
 Jim Kennedy (cricketer) (1932–2007), English cricketer
 J. Walter Kennedy (1912–1977), commissioner of the National Basketball Association
 Jamie Kennedy (ice hockey) (born 1946), Canadian hockey player, World Hockey Association 
 Jimmy Kennedy (wrestler) (born 1988), American wrestler
 James "Radio" Kennedy (1946-2019), American football fixture
 Jim Kennedy (sports administrator) (1925–2018), Irish president of the LGFA

Other
 James Kennedy (bishop) (1408–1465), Bishop of Dunkeld and St Andrews
 James Shaw Kennedy (1788–1865), British General and military writer, Knight Commander, Order of the Bath
 James Kennedy (engineer) (1797–1886), British locomotive engineer
 James Kennedy (social psychologist) (born 1950), American social psychologist, originator of particle swarm optimization
 James Kennedy (historian) (born 1963), American historian, professor, University of Amsterdam
 James Kennedy (security guard) (1930–1973), Scottish security guard, posthumously awarded the George Cross
 D. James Kennedy (1930–2007), televangelist; founder Coral Ridge Presbyterian Church, Fort Lauderdale, Florida
 William James Kennedy, known as Jim Kennedy, British geologist and museum director
 Jamie Kennedy (chef), Canadian chef
 James Kennedy (priest), Irish Anglican priest
 James Mackintosh Kennedy (1848–1922), Scottish-American poet, editor, and engineer
James “Jibs” Kennedy, guitarist and backing vocalist of Oceans Ate Alaska